KUOW (1340 AM, "News & Information") is a radio station broadcasting a News Talk Information format. Licensed to Tumwater, Washington, United States, the station is currently owned by the University of Washington and operated by KUOW Puget Sound Public Radio. It features programming from American Public Media, National Public Radio, and Public Radio International. The station is currently a simulcast of sister station KUOW-FM.

References

External links
 

 
 

UOW
News and talk radio stations in the United States
Thurston County, Washington
NPR member stations